The Osaka school massacre was a mass murder that occurred at Ikeda Elementary School in Ikeda, Osaka Prefecture, Japan on 8 June 2001, in which Mamoru Takuma, a 37-year-old ex-convict with a history of mentally disturbed and anti-social behavior, stabbed eight students to death and seriously wounded fifteen others in a knife attack that lasted several minutes. Takuma was sentenced to death in August 2003 and executed in September 2004.

Background
Mamoru Takuma was a 37-year-old ex-convict from Itami, Hyōgo Prefecture, who had a long history of mentally disturbed and anti-social behavior since childhood, and an extensive criminal record that included a conviction for rape. As a teenager, Takuma's volatile behavior led to him being kicked out of school and his father eventually disowning him. After being released from prison in 1989, Takuma moved to the nearby city of Ikeda, Osaka Prefecture, working various part-time jobs in the area but often being fired for erratic or violent behavior. In 1999, he was detained at a psychiatric hospital while working as a janitor at Itami City Ikejiri Elementary after slipping his temazepam into tea he served in a teachers' room at the school, resulting in staff being hospitalized. Takuma attempted suicide at the psychiatric hospital, but was soon determined as fit to be released. In October 2000, Takuma was charged for assaulting a bellhop while working as a taxi driver in Osaka.

Attack 
On 8 June 2001, at 10:15 a.m. local time, Takuma entered the elite Ikeda Elementary School, which was affiliated with Osaka Kyoiku University. Armed with a kitchen knife, he began stabbing school children and teachers at random, killing eight students aged between seven and eight, and seriously wounded thirteen other children and two teachers. Takuma was wrestled into submission by several staff members after a few minutes of rampaging, and began ranting incoherent statements. 

Takuma had committed the massacre the day of his court hearing for assaulting the bellhop in October 2000.

Fatalities
All of the victims were female second-graders except for one first-grade boy.

Yuki Hongo (本郷 優希 Hongō Yūki)
Mayuko Isaka (猪阪 真宥子 Isaka Mayuko)
Yuuka Kiso (木曽 友香 Kiso Yūka)
Ayano Moriwaki (森脇 綾乃 Moriwaki Ayano)
Maki Sakai (酒井 麻希 Sakai Maki)
Takahiro Totsuka (戸塚 健大 Totsuka Takahiro) (the only boy to die in the attack)
Hana Tsukamoto (塚本 花菜 Tsukamoto Hana)
Rena Yamashita (山下 玲奈 Yamashita Rena)

Aftermath
Takuma was diagnosed with paranoid personality disorder. He was later convicted and sentenced to death by hanging; he was executed on September 14, 2004.

The attack is currently the sixth largest mass murder, along with the Matsumoto incident, in recent Japanese history, exceeded in fatalities only by the Tokyo subway sarin attack, the Osaka movie theater fire, the Sagamihara stabbings, Kyoto Animation arson attack, and the Myojo 56 building fire. At the time, it was tied with the Matsumoto sarin attack as the second deadliest, behind the Tokyo subway sarin attack. The incident set itself apart, however, by the age of the victims, its venue (a school), and the perpetrator's history of mental illness. Because of these factors, the attack raised questions about Japan's social policies for dealing with mental illness, the rights of victims and criminals, and the accessibility and security of Japanese schools.

After the attack, Yoshio Yamane, the principal administrator of the school, announced that it would bring in a security guard, an at-the-time unheard-of practice at Japanese schools. Additionally, J-pop artist Hikaru Utada rearranged her song "Distance" in honor of Rena Yamashita, one of the murdered schoolgirls (because of an essay contest the girl had won, talking about how she respected and wanted to be like Hikaru), renaming it "Final Distance".

Some children, faculty and parents developed post-traumatic stress disorder (PTSD).

See also

Akihabara massacre
School massacre
Mass murder
List of massacres in Japan

References

External links

Postwar Japan
Massacres in 2001
School massacres in Asia
Massacres in Japan
Deaths by stabbing in Japan
Mass stabbings in Japan
June 2001 crimes
June 2001 events in Japan
Knife attacks
2001 murders in Japan
Mass murder in Japan
Violence against children
Ikeda, Osaka
Mass murder in 2004